Davik is a former municipality in the traditional district of Nordfjord in the old Sogn og Fjordane county (now Vestland), Norway. The  former municipality existed from 1838 until 1964 and it encompassed all the lands surrounding the outer part of the large Nordfjorden on both sides of the fjord.  Davik was located in parts of the present-day municipalities of Kinn, Bremanger, and Stad.  The administrative center of the former municipality was the village of Davik which is located on the southern shore of the Nordfjorden, although some of the municipal services were based out of the village of Bryggja on the north side of the fjord, since that village was the largest village in Davik municipality.

Davik Church was the main church for the municipality, and it was located in the village of Davik, in the central part of the municipality.  Rugsund Church (in the village of Rugsund) served the western part of the municipality and Ålfoten Church (in the village of Ålfoten) served the eastern part of the municipality.

Name
The municipality (originally the parish) is named after the old Davik farm, since the first Davik Church was located there.  The first element means "spear" and the last element is identical with the word vik which means "inlet", so the name appears to be referring to the long, skinny spear-like shape of the local fjord. Historically, the municipal name was spelled Davigen or Davig, using the old spelling forms that have changed over time.

History
Davik was established as a municipality on 1 January 1838 (see formannskapsdistrikt law). On 1 January 1913, the Mettenes farm (population: 3, located on the south shore of the Nordfjorden in extreme eastern Davik) was transferred to the neighboring municipality of Gloppen. During the 1960s, there were many municipal mergers across Norway due to the work of the Schei Committee. On 1 January 1964, Davik municipality ceased to exist and its territory was divided between the neighboring municipalities of Bremanger, Eid, and Kinn as follows:
The islands of Husevågøya, Grindøya, Gangsøya, Risøya, and all of Davik that was north of the Nordfjorden and east of the village of Lefdal went to the new Vågsøy municipality.  The population of this area was 1,216 at the time of the merger.
All of Davik south of the Nordfjorden and all the islands that did not go to Kinn Municipality went to Bremanger Municipality.  The population of this area was 1,567 at the time of the merger.
All of Davik north of the Nordfjorden and east of the village of Lefdal (including Lefdal) went to Eid Municipality.  The population of this area was 654 at the time of the merger.

Government

Municipal council
The municipal council  of Davik was made up of 29 representatives that were elected to four year terms.  The party breakdown of the final municipal council was as follows:

See also
List of former municipalities of Norway

References

External links

1905 map of the municipality of Davik
Weather information for Davik 

Kinn
Bremanger
Stad, Norway
Former municipalities of Norway
1838 establishments in Norway
1964 disestablishments in Norway